The Vineyard is a historic home and farm complex located at Bel Air, Harford County, Maryland, United States. It consists of a cluster of buildings on a knoll in the center of a  working grain and livestock farm. The main house is a large stone structure, the oldest section of which comprises a two-story side stairhall / double parlor dwelling built about 1804. Two bays were added to the old house around 1870.  Historically significant outbuildings, include two structures (a dairy/smokehouse, and an ice house.

The Vineyard was listed on the National Register of Historic Places in 1994.

References

External links
, including photo from 1993, Maryland Historical Trust website

Houses in Bel Air, Harford County, Maryland
Federal architecture in Maryland
Victorian architecture in Maryland
Houses on the National Register of Historic Places in Maryland
Houses completed in 1804
National Register of Historic Places in Harford County, Maryland
1804 establishments in Maryland